Cefn Viaduct may refer to one of these places in Wales:

Cefn Coed Viaduct, viaduct in Merthyr Tydfil County Borough
Cefn Newbridge Viaduct, viaduct in Wrexham County Borough